Hans Heinrich may refer to:

Hans Reimann (writer) (1889–1969), pseudonym Hans Heinrich, German writer
Hans Heinrich (director) (1911–2003), German film director
Hans Heinrich XV (1861–1938), Silesian nobleman